Devon Rifkin is an American entrepreneur who was awarded Entrepreneur Magazine's Entrepreneur of the Year Award in 2008. He is the founder and former CEO of The Great American Hanger Company (also known as Hangers.com).

Education
Rifkin is a graduate of Palmetto High School in Miami, Florida.

The Great American Hanger Company
In 2000, Rifkin started The Great American Hanger Company, to raise money for the company, he offered his apartment as collateral and borrowed $30,000 to purchase a container of 100,000 garment hangers. In 2001 he acquired the domain name Hangers.com for $10,000. Customers included Ralph Lauren, DKNY, New York Yankees, J. Lo, California Closets, Hilton Hotels, Oprah Winfrey, Sasha & Malia Obama and Michael Jordan. Rifkin built the business until 2012 when it was acquired by International Hanger.

Personal life
Devon is a resident of Atlanta, Georgia where he lives with his wife and their three children.

National awards
As the founder and CEO of The Great American Hanger Company, Rifkin, was awarded Entrepreneur Magazine’s "Entrepreneur of the Year" Award.

References

American chief executives
Living people
Year of birth missing (living people)
Businesspeople from Miami